Eric Boyd may refer to the following people:

Eric DeWayne Boyd, one of the perpetrators in the murders of Channon Christian and Christopher Newsom
Eric L. Boyd, American software engineer
Eric Boyd (basketball), member of the 1984–85 North Carolina A&T Aggies men's basketball team
Eric Boyd, a gameshow host on the local PBS affiliate KEDT in Corpus Christi, Texas
Eric Boyd, a boy killed by a stray bullet at the St. Thomas Development in New Orleans, LA in 1992
Eric Boyd, co-founder of the web search engine StumbleUpon